Smith, Elder & Co., alternatively Smith, Elder, and Co. or Smith, Elder and Co. was a British publishing company which was most noted for the works it published in the 19th century. It was purchased by John Murray in the early 1900s, its archive now kept as part of the John Murray Archive at the National Library of Scotland in Edinburgh, Scotland.

History 

The firm was founded by George Smith (1789–1846) and Alexander Elder (1790–1876) and successfully continued by George Murray Smith (1824–1901). They are known to have published as early as 1826.

They are notable for producing the first edition of the Dictionary of National Biography (DNB).

The firm achieved its first major success with the publication of Charlotte Brontë's Jane Eyre in 1847, under the pseudonym of "Currer Bell".

Other major authors published by the firm included Robert Browning, George Eliot, Elizabeth Gaskell, Thomas Hardy, Richard Jefferies, George MacDonald, Charles Reade, John Ruskin, Algernon Charles Swinburne, Alfred Tennyson and George Gissing.

In addition, beginning in 1841, they published The London and Edinburgh Magazine. Beginning in 1859, they published Cornhill Magazine.

In 1909 the firm was being run by Reginald Smith.

Works published 
 The Comic Offering volumes one through five by Louisa Henrietta Sheridan, 1831–1835
 Friendship's Offering, 1837
 Illustrations of the Zoology of South Africa by Andrew Smith, 1838–50
Zoology of the Voyage of H.M.S. Beagle by Charles Darwin, 1838–43
 Modern Painters by John Ruskin, 1843
 Jane Eyre by Charlotte Brontë, 1847
 The King of the Golden River by John Ruskin, 1851
 The History of Henry Esmond by William Makepeace Thackeray, 1852
 The Professor by Charlotte Brontë, 1854
 The Ring and the Book by Robert Browning, 1868–69
 The Mayor of Casterbridge by Thomas Hardy, 1886
 The Great Boer War by Arthur Conan Doyle, 1900
 The Riddle of the Sands by Erskine Childers, 1903
 Morocco in Diplomacy by Edmund Dene Morel, 1912
 Jane Austen: Her Life and Letters, A Family Record by William and Richard Arthur Austen-Leigh, 1913
 The Adventures Of Philip by William Makepeace Thackeray, 1899

Book series
 Illustrated Editions of Popular Works
 Popular Library

References

Further reading
 Jenifer Smith, Prince of Publishers: A Biography of George Smith , London: Allison & Busby, 1986

External links 

 The House of Smith Elder by Leonard Huxley (London: Smith, Elder, & Co., 1923) at the Internet Archive

Book publishing companies of the United Kingdom
Defunct companies based in London
1839 establishments in England
Magazine publishing companies of the United Kingdom